Mukti is a 1937 Indian Hindi and Bengali-language drama film, directed by Pramathesh Barua and produced by New Theatres.

Plot

An artist, Prasanta (Barua) is dedicated to his art. He pays little heed to gossip about him arising from the fact that he paints nude female forms. His conservative and rich father-in-law is unhappy with his cavalier attitude towards propriety. Prasanta, annoyed by his interference, aggravates him intentionally. Prasanta's rich young wife Chitra (Kanan Devi) loves him earnestly, but neither is willing to adjust to the other's lifestyle and behavior. Eventually, the marriage falls apart. Prasanta concedes to his wife's demand for a divorce and leaves for the jungles of Assam. There he meets the friendly Jharna (Menaka), the wife of an innkeeper named Pahari (P. Mullick/S.Nawab) and raises a wild elephant calf. He also makes a sworn enemy of a local trader (J.sethi/A. Mullick). Chitra marries a rich man named Bipul and they go on an elephant hunt. They end up killing Prasanta's pet elephant. Chitra believes Prasanta to be dead. To keep up the falsehood, Prasanta avoids meeting her. But he is forced to rescue her from the lecherous trader. Prasanta dies in the process leaving Chitra devastated. But both of them finally gain mukti (freedom) from their ill-fated love.

Cast 
Bengali Version
Pramathesh Barua
Kanan Devi
Pankaj Mullick
Menaka Devi
Amar Mullick
Shailen Chowdhury
Indu Mukhopadhyay
Devabala
Prafulla Roy
Ahi Sanyal

Hindi Version
Pramathesh Barua
Kanan Devi
S.M. Nawab
Menaka Devi
Jagdish Sethi
Pankaj Mullick
Bikram Kapoor
Prafulla Roy
Ahi Sanyal
Devabala

External links 

 Mukti at indiancine.ma

Articles containing video clips
1937 films
1930s Hindi-language films
Bengali-language Indian films
Films about adultery in India
Indian drama films
1937 drama films
Indian black-and-white films
1930s Bengali-language films
Hindi-language drama films
Films scored by Pankaj Mullick